Amina Djibo Bazindre (born 28 January 1955) is a Nigerien diplomat. On 5 February 2010, she became Ambassador of Niger to Russia.

Biography
In 2005, Amina Bazindre is listed as the Ambassador of Niger to Hungary on the website of the Hungarian Ministry of Foreign Affairs.

On 5 February 2010, she became the Ambassador of Niger to Russia.

In January 2011, she is received by Angela Merkel and Christian Wulff as the Ambassador of Niger to Germany. Her responsibilities also included a diplomatic representation in Slovakia.

In December 2011, she was also named Inspector of the diplomatic and consulate services of Niger. In April 2013, she was named General Secretary of the national commission of the Francophonie.

On the website of the Ministry of Foreign Affairs of Romania, Amina Bazindre is listed as the Ambassador of Niger to Romania (2018).

References

Living people
Ambassadors of Niger to Russia
1955 births
Nigerien women ambassadors